Ephraim Urbach (Hebrew: אפרים אלימלך אורבך) (born 1912 – 3 July 1991) was a distinguished scholar of Judaism. He is best known for his landmark works on rabbinic thought, The Sages, and for research on the Tosafot. He was a candidate to presidency in Israel in 1973, but wasn't elected.

A professor of Talmud at the Hebrew University of Jerusalem, Urbach was a member and president of the Israel Academy of Sciences and Humanities.

Biography
Ephraim Elimelech Urbach was born in Białystok, Poland, to a hasidic family. He studied in Rome and Breslau, where he received rabbinic ordination. He immigrated to Mandatory Palestine in 1937. He served as a rabbi in the British army during World War II. He also took part in Israel's 1948 War of Independence and thereafter worked for several educational institutions before joining the Hebrew University faculty in 1953.

Urbach died on 3 July 1991 at Hadassah Hospital in Jerusalem after a long illness.  He is buried at the Mount of Olives in Jerusalem, near Menachem Begin.

Published works
 The Sages 
  דרשות חז"ל על נביאי אומות העולם ועל פרשת בלעם  "Rabbinic Exegesis About Gentile Prophets And The Balaam Passage" (Hebrew), Tarbitz (25:1956), Urbach explored the interpretation of the rabbis about Gittin 57a where Onkelos raises up Balaam from hell, and concluded that Balaam was not a reference to Jesus in the Talmud.

Awards and recognition 
 In 1955, Urbach was awarded the Israel Prize, for Jewish studies.
 In 1983, he was a co-recipient (jointly with Nechama Leibowitz) of the Bialik Prize for Jewish thought.

See also 
List of Bialik Prize recipients
List of Israel Prize recipients

References 

Israeli Orthodox rabbis
Talmudists
20th-century Polish rabbis
British Army personnel of World War II
Academic staff of the Hebrew University of Jerusalem
Israel Prize in Jewish studies recipients
Israel Prize Rabbi recipients
Members of the Israel Academy of Sciences and Humanities
Hasidic rabbis in Mandatory Palestine
People from Białystok
Polish emigrants to Mandatory Palestine
Israeli Hasidic rabbis
1912 births
1991 deaths
Rabbis in the military
Israeli anti–nuclear weapons activists
Burials at the Jewish cemetery on the Mount of Olives
Presidents of the Israel Academy of Sciences and Humanities
Candidates for President of Israel